Mamili (also Romanized as Mamīlī) is a village in Shahi Rural District, Sardasht District, Dezful County, Khuzestan Province, Iran. At the 2006 census, its population was 86, in 16 families.

References 

Populated places in Dezful County